The Anglican Diocese of Orlu is one of 12 within the Anglican Province of Owerri, itself one of 14 provinces within the Church of Nigeria. The  current bishop is Benjamin Chinedum Okeke.

Notes

Church of Nigeria dioceses
Dioceses of the Province of Owerri